Lucy Creamer (born 19 April 1971) is a British professional climber. Creamer was born in Taunton, Somerset, but now lives in Sheffield - a city known for its large climbing community.

After working as an outdoor instructor Creamer became a full-time climber and has entered many climbing competitions.

Media appearances

BBC
In 2011, Creamer appeared with Dr Jonathan Foyle in the BBC series Climbing Great Buildings. In the series, they climbed fifteen British buildings dating from the Norman era to the twenty-first century.

Climbing competitions
According to her website her competition rankings are as follows:

British Leading Champion: 1997/98, 1999, 2001, 2003, 2005, 2006, 2007.
British Bouldering Champion: 2001.
British Masters Champion: 1998.
Best International result: Qualified through to final round, 9th place, 2003.
Best Ice competition result: 2nd place, Ouray International Ice Festival.

See also
Grade (climbing)
Ice climbing

References

External links
 UK Climbing Interview

1971 births
Living people
British rock climbers
English mountain climbers
Female climbers
Sportspeople from Sheffield
Sportspeople from Taunton
Ice climbers